Mestawet Tufa (Amharic: መስታወት ቱፋ; born 14 September 1983 in Arsi) is an Ethiopian long-distance runner. She was the winner of the women's 10,000 metres at the 2007 All-Africa Games and the runner up in the senior women's race at the 2008 World Cross Country Championships.

Career
She competed at the Olympic Games, but did not finish her 10,000 metres race.

Tufa equaled the 15 Kilometres road running African record of 46:57 minutes in Nijmegen in November 2008. Elana Meyer had run the same time in 1991.

She competed in her first mountain race at the Obudu Ranch International Mountain Race in Nigeria. She ran strongly, leading the race until the last 400 m. However, she failed to finish as she collapsed due to severe dehydration 50 m from the finish line and was treated by a medical team. She returned to the race the following year and finished as runner-up, just one second behind the winner Mamitu Daska.

She took third place at the Dam tot Damloop 10-mile run in September 2010, finishing with a time of 52:43.

Mestawet set a course record of 1:10:03 to win the 2013 Gifu Seiryu Half Marathon.

Achievements

Personal bests
3000 metres - 8:47.41 (2006)
5000 metres - 14:51.72 (2007)
10,000 metres - 30:38.33 (2008)
Half marathon - 1:09:11 (2009)

References

External links

Mestewat Tufa- Let Her Run! - Profiel from Ethiopian Running Blog. Roocha.net. 08-July-2008.

1983 births
Living people
Ethiopian female long-distance runners
Athletes (track and field) at the 2008 Summer Olympics
Olympic athletes of Ethiopia
Sportspeople from Oromia Region
Ethiopian female marathon runners
African Games gold medalists for Ethiopia
African Games medalists in athletics (track and field)
Athletes (track and field) at the 2007 All-Africa Games